This is a list of women writers who were born in Serbia or whose writings are closely associated with that country.

A
Draginja Adamović (1925–2000), poet
Mira Alečković (1924–2008),poet
Princess Anka Obrenović (1821–1868), hers were the first literary works compiled by a woman to be published in Serbia
Smilja Avramov (1918–2018), nonfiction writer
Eustahija Arsić (1776–1843), writer

B
Jelena Balšić (1365/1366–1443), her three epistles are part of the Gorički zbornik (Cyrillic: Горички зборник), a medieval manuscript collection (See: Jelena Lazarević)
Anabela Basalo (born 1972), novelist, short-story writer
Isidora Bjelica (born 1967), prose writer, playwright 
Marina Blagojević (1958–2020), writer on gender and feminism
Milica Bodrožić, political history writer
Jelica Belović-Bernadzikowska (1870–1946), writer
Lukrecija Bogašinović Budmani (1710–1784), writer. This writer also holds a place in the Serbian literature of the 18th century.
Anica Bošković (1714–1804), writer and poet. She's the sister of the famed physicist and scientist Roger Joseph Boscovich.
Danica Bandić (1871–1950), writer (See also: Danica Bandić Telečki)

C
Elizabeth Christitch (1861–1933), Irish journalist, writer, poet, translator and Serbian patriot.
Annie Christitch (1885–1977), Serbian journalist, patriot and women's rights activist.

D
Jelena Dimitrijević (1862–1945), short story writer, novelist, poet
Jelena Đurović (born 1973), journalist
Rajna Dragićević, writer, dictionary collaborator
Draga Dejanović (1840–1871), poet

F
 Helen Losanitch Frothingham (1885–1972), best known for her  Mission for Serbia: Letters from America and Canada, a collection of her letters during the six years she travelled doing war relief work during the First World War.

H
Ljiljana Habjanović Đurović (born 1953), novelist

I
Branislava Ilić (born 1970), playwright, screenwriter, prose writer, essayist

J
Jefimija (1349–1405), poet
Zorica Jevremović Munitić (born 1948), playwright, literary historian

K
Olivera Katarina (born 1940), poet
Irena Kazazić (born 1972), writer
Stoja Kašiković, née Zdjelarević (1865 – after 1927), writer
Mina Karadžić (1828–1894), writer and painter

L
Jelena Lazarević (1365–1443), writer
Paulina Lebl-Albala (1891–1967), journalist, translator, literary critic
Vladana Likar-Smiljanić (born 1943), correspondent
Tamara Lujak (born 1976), science fiction and fantasy writer, translator, editor, journalist, short story writer, book reviewer
Svetlana Lukić (born 1958), journalist
Jelena Lozanić (See: Helen Losanitch Frothingham)
Andjelija Lazarević (1885–1926), writer

M
Desanka Maksimović (1898–1993), poet
Jasmina Mihajlović (born 1960), writer and literary critic
Princess Milica of Serbia (c. 1335 – 1405), poet, author of "A Mother's Prayer"
Ognjenka Milićević (1927–2008), translator, essayist
Mir-Jam (1887–1952), novelist
Nadežka Mosusova (born 1928), non-fiction writer
Zorica Mršević (born 1954), non-fiction writer on gender equality, violence, human rights, marginalized groups, and jurisprudence
Ana Marija Marović (1815–1887), poet and painter
Mara Đorđević-Malagurski (1894–1971), writer and ethnologist
Milena Mrazović (1863–1927), Austro-Hungarian writer
Maga Magazinović (1882–1968), journalist and writer
Jelisaveta Marković (1868–1953), translator from French, Latin, Norwegian, and English

N
Anna Novakov (born 1959), art historian, art critic

O
Vida Ognjenović (born 1941), playwright, writer
Princess Anka Obrenović (1821–1868), writer

P
Milena Pavlović-Barili (1909–1945), poet
Mira Adanja Polak (born 1942), journalist, television presenter
Maria Palaiologina, Queen of Serbia (c. 1300 – 1355), writer

R
Eva Ras (born 1941), poet, short story writer, novelist
Ana Ristović (born 1972), poet and translator

S
Anica Savić Rebac (1892–1953), translator, essayist, biographer
Ljiljana Smajlović (born 1956), journalist, newspaper editor
Milica Stojadinović-Srpkinja (1828–1878), poet
Maša Stokić (born 1966), dramatist, drama critic
Gordana Suša (1946–2021), journalist
Staka Skenderova (1830–1891), Bosnian Serb writer
Olivia Sudjic (born 1988), British novelist
Isidora Sekulić (1877–1958), novelist
Jela Spiridonović-Savić (1891–1974), poet and fiction writer
Dubravka Sekulić (born 1980), author and architect
Sofija Skoric (born 193?), cultural activist and author
Ružica Sokić (1934–2013), actress and writer
Svetlana Spajić (born 1971), cultural activist and translator
Mirjana Stefanović (1939–2021), writer
Jelena Skerlić Ćorović (1870–1960), writer and translator
Andjelija Stančić (1865–1955), writer and translator

T
Ana Tasić (born 1978), theatre critic
Jasmina Tešanović (born 1954) essayist, short story writer, translator
Danica Bandić Telečki (1871–1950), writer

V
Svetlana Velmar-Janković (1933–2014), novelist, essayist, chronicler
Divna M. Vuksanović (born 1965), non-fiction writer, philosopher
Nada Vilotijević (born 1953), professor and author
Sonja Veselinović (born 1981), writer

Z
Nina Živančević (born 1957), Serbian-born playwright, poet, novelist, critic
Cvijeta Zuzorić (1552–1648), lyric poet; the Cvijeta Zuzorić Art Pavilion in Belgrade (Serbia) is named after her

See also
List of women writers
List of Serbian writers
Serbian literature

References

-
Serbian women writers, List of
Writers
Writers, women